Rat Defense is the name of multiple chess openings:

Rat Defense, Balogh Defense: 1. d4 d6 2. e4 f5
Rat Defense, Accelerated Gurgenidze: 1. e4 g6 2. d4 d6 3. Nc3 c6 
Rat Defense, Antal Defense:  1. d4 d6 2. e4 Nd7
Rat Defense, English Rat: 1. d4 d6 2. c4 e5
Rat Defense, Norwegian Rat: 1. e4 g6, 2. d4 Nf6
Rat Defense, Harmonist: 1. e4 d6 2. f4  
 Rat Defense, Fuller Gambit: 1. e4 d6 2. f4 d5 3. exd5 Nf6 
Rat Defense, Petruccioli Attack: 1. e4 d6 2. h4 
Rat Defense, Spike Attack: 1. e4 d6 2. g4 
Rat Defense, Small Center Defense: 1. d4 d6 2. e4 e6

Chess openings